Nikolaus Hagenauer (c. 1445/1460 — before 1538) was a German late gothic sculptor from Hagenau (Alsace in the Holy Roman Empire, present day France). He was most likely born as Niklas Zimmerlin, but was also documented and signed works as Niclas Hagenauer, Niklaus Hagenauer, Niclas Hagnower, Niklaus Hagnower, Niclas von Hagenau and other variants.

Further reading 
 Peter Barnet and Nancy Wu: The Cloisters Medieval Art and Architecture 2005, New York, The Metropolitan Museum of Art, Yale University Press, New Haven and London
 Max Seidel: Der Isenheimer Altar von Mathis Grünewald, 1990, Stuttgart und Zürich, Belser Verlag
 Vincent Mayr. "Hagenauer, Nikolaus." In Grove Art Online. Oxford Art Online, (accessed January 30, 2012; subscription required)

External links 
 
 Entry for Nikolaus Hagenauer on the Union List of Artist Names

Medieval German sculptors
German male sculptors
15th-century births
16th-century deaths
People from Haguenau